The following is a list of notable deaths in March 1994.

Entries for each day are listed alphabetically by surname. A typical entry lists information in the following sequence:
 Name, age, country of citizenship at birth, subsequent country of citizenship (if applicable), reason for notability, cause of death (if known), and reference.

March 1994

1
Manmohan Desai, 57, Indian film producer and director.
Eliseo Diego, 70, Cuban poet and writer of short stories.
Ludwig Günderoth, 83, German football player and manager.
Alexei Haieff, 79, American composer of orchestral and choral works.
Herbert Schade, 71, West German long-distance runner and Olympian.
Dallas Shirley, 80, American basketball referee.
Armonía Somers, 79, Uruguayan feminist, pedagogue, and novelist.
Tim Souster, 51, British composer and writer on music.
Ethel Terrell, 68, American politician.
Joe Tipton, 72, American baseball player.

2
Kleggie Hermsen, 70, American basketball player.
Walter Kent, 82, American composer and conductor.
Giuseppe La Loggia, 82, Italian politician, lawyer and teacher.
Donald M. MacKinnon, 80, Scottish philosopher and theologian.
Anita Morris, 50, American actress, singer and dancer, ovarian cancer.
Yevgeniya Zhigulenko, 73, Soviet pilot and navigator during World War II and Hero of the Soviet Union.

3
Ida Gramcko, 69, Venezuelan essayist and poet.
Roman Haubenstock-Ramati, 75, Composer and music editor.
Karel Kryl, 49, Czechoslovak poet, singer-songwriter and activist, heart attack.
Bilge Olgaç, 54, Turkish film director.
Ezra Stone, 76, American actor and director, traffic collision.
Lars Widding, 69, Swedish author and journalist.
John Edward Williams, 71, American author, editor and professor.
Gary Wood, 52, American gridiron football player.

4
Gianni Agus, 76, Italian actor.
Aníbal, 53, Mexican Luchador (professional wrestler), brain cancer.
John Candy, 43, Canadian actor (Planes, Trains and Automobiles, Spaceballs, Uncle Buck) and comedian, Emmy winner (1982, 1983), heart attack.
George Edward Hughes, 75, Irish-New Zealand philosopher and logician.
Marie-Joseph Lemieux, 91, Canadian Catholic archbishop and Holy See diplomat.

5
Abdullah as-Sallal, 77, President of the Yemen Arab Republic.
Joseph Birdsell, 85, American anthropologist.
Arnold Brown, 66, Canadian politician.
Jan Dobraczyński, 83, Polish writer, novelist, and politician.
Abd El-Karim Sakr, 75, Egyptian football player.

6
Tengiz Abuladze, 70, Georgian film director, screenwriter, and theatre teacher.
Mane Bajić, 52, Serbian midfielder, traffic collision.
Larry Eyler, 41, American serial killer, AIDS-related complications.
Yvonne Fair, 51, American singer, cancer.
Conrad Heidkamp, 88, German football player and manager.
Melina Mercouri, 73, Greek actress, singer, activist and politician, cancer.
Tony Momsen, 66, American gridiron football player.
Ken Noritake, 71, Japanese football player.

7
Ray Arcel, 94, American boxing trainer.
Fortunato Arena, 71, Italian stuntman and actor.
James Hannigan, 65, Irish-prelate of the Roman Catholic Church.
Stew Hofferth, 81, American baseball player.

8
Mervyn Brogan, 79, Australian Army general.
Leonard K. Carson, 70, American Air Force fighter ace.
Rosemary Du Cros, 92, British aviation pioneer.
John Ewart, 66, Australian actor, head and neck cancer.
Knut Haukelid, 82, Norwegian military officer.
Eufrosinia Kersnovskaya, 86, Russian memoirist and Gulag prisoner.
Yvonne Martin, 82, French film editor.
Brian McGowan, 58, Australian politician.

9
Zoltán Beke, 82, Romanian football player and coach.
Karl Wilhelm Berkhan, 78, American politician.
Wilhelm Brese, 97, German politician and member of the Bundestag.
Charles Bukowski, 73, German-American poet, novelist, and short story writer, leukemia.
Paul Dubreil, 90, French mathematician.
Elbie Fletcher, 77, American baseball player.
Jon Kimche, 84, Swiss-British journalist and historian.
Moe Purtill, 77, American swing jazz drummer.
Devika Rani, 85, Indian actress.
Fernando Rey, 76, Spanish actor, bladder cancer.
Lawrence E. Spivak, 93, American publisher and journalist.

10
Roger Bocquet, 72, Swiss football player.
Rupert Bruce-Mitford, 79, British archaeologist and scholar.
Aurelio Galleppini, 76, Italian comics artist and illustrator.
Pierre-Olivier Lapie, 92, French essayist and novelist.
Robert Shea, 61, American novelist and journalist.

11
Fausta Cialente, 95, Italian novelist, journalist and political activist.
Evelyn Gardner, 90, British socialite.
Aldo Puccinelli, 73, Italian football player and manager.
Kaku Takashina, 75, Japanese actor.
Brenda Wootton, 66, English folk singer and poet.

12
Gordy Coleman, 59, American baseball player.
Philippe Daudy, 68, French member of the French Resistance, journalist, and novelist.
Frank Gorrell, 66, American politician, choking incident.
Don Joseph, 70, American jazz musician.
Mehmed Orhan, 86, Ottoman prince and head of the Ottoman dynasty,

13
Danny Barker, 85, American jazz musician, vocalist, and author .
Jean Gourguet, 91, French film director, screenwriter and film producer.
Sam Ranzino, 66, American college and basketball player.
Martha Esther Rogers, 79, American nurse, theorist, and author.
Buddy Rosar, 80, American baseball player.
Eva Gräfin Finck von Finckenstein, 90, American politician.
John Yeon, 83, American architect, heart failure.

14
Sally Belfrage, 57, American writer and journalist, cancer.
Serge Blusson, 65, French cyclist and Olympian.
Tony Freitas, 85, American baseball player.
Otto Hartmann, 90, Austrian stage and film actor.
Sheila Humphreys, 95, Irish political activist.
Willie Hobbs Moore, 59, American physicist and engineer, cancer.
Floyd Reid, 66, American gridiron football player.
Indra Sen, 90, Indian psychologist.
Georges Claes sr., 74, Belgian racing cyclist.

15
Charlie Bivins, 55, American gridiron football player.
Bill Green, 53, American basketball player.
Jack Hargreaves, 82, English television presenter and writer.
M. K. Indira, 77, Indian novelist.
Tom Kirk, 78, Australian rugby player.
Josef Kohout, 79, Austrian Nazi concentration camp survivor and author.
Jürgen Manger, 71, German actor and comedian.

16
Albert Bühlmann, 70, Swiss physician, heart failure.
Nicolas Flagello, 66, American composer and conductor of classical music.
Richard Nugent, Baron Nugent of Guildford, 86, British politician.
Mykola Kudrytsky, 31, Ukrainian football player, traffic collision.
Eric Show, 37, American Major League Baseball player, drug overdose.
Kantarō Suga, 59, Japanese actor, traffic accident.

17
Charlotte Auerbach, 94, German geneticist.
Wilson Homer Elkins, 85, American educator and university administrator.
Walter Janka, 79, German communist, political activist and writer.
Elenjikal Chandy Kuruvila, 71, Indian Navy flag officer.
Ellsworth Vines, 82, American tennis champion
Mai Zetterling, 68, Swedish actress, novelist and film director, cancer.

18
William Bergsma, 72, American composer and teacher, heart attack.
Peter Borgelt, 66, German television actor, cancer.
Yehia Chahine, 76, Egyptian film producer and actor.
Andrew Crawford, 76, Scottish actor.
David Ginsburg, 73, British politician.
Erwin Kohn, 82, Austrian table tennis player.
Günter Mittag, 67, German politician.

19
Rafig Babayev, 57, Azerbaijani jazz musician and author of scores for films, terrorist attack.
José Coronel Hurtecho, 88, Nicaraguan poet, critic, playwright, and diplomat.
Jim Lawrence, 75, American author.
Josef Meixner, 85, German theoretical physicist.
Charles Paris, 82, American comic book artist.
Benjamin Clemens Stone, 61, British–American botanist.

20
Ilaria Alpi, 32, Italian journalist, killed in ambush.
Ramón Camps, 67, Argentine general during the dirty war, prostate cancer.
Irvin Flores, 69, Puerto Rican political activist.
Lewis Grizzard, 47, American writer and humorist.
Reg Groth, 80, Australian politician.
Miran Hrovatin, 44, Italian photographer and camera operator, killed in ambush.
Alfonso Rodríguez Salas, 54, Spanish football player, colorectal cancer.

21
Macdonald Carey, 81, American actor (Days of Our Lives, Shadow of a Doubt, Lock-Up), lung cancer.
Lili Damita, 89, French-American actress and singer, Alzheimer's disease.
Franz Pelikan, 68, Austrian football goalkeeper.
Dack Rambo, 52, American actor (Dallas, The Guns of Will Sonnett, The Loretta Young Show), AIDS-related complications.

22
Dan Hartman, 43, American musician and record producer, AIDS-related complications.
Horton Holcombe Hobbs, Jr., 79, American taxonomist and carcinologist.
Walter Lantz, 94, American cartoonist and animator (Woody Woodpecker), heart failure.
Ulrich Poltera, 71, Swiss ice hockey player.

23
Luis Donaldo Colosio, 44, Mexican economist and politician, homicide.
Nancy Cárdenas, 59, Mexican actor, poet, writer and feminist.
Álvaro del Portillo, 80, Spanish Roman Catholic bishop and prelate of Opus Dei.
Giulietta Masina, 73, Italian film actress, lung cancer.
Goar Mestre, 81, Cuban-Argentine businessman, cancer.
Donald Swann, 70, Welsh musician, singer and entertainer, cancer.
Paula Trueman, 96, American actress (The Outlaw Josey Wales, Dirty Dancing, Moonstruck).
Valentina Vladimirova, 66, Ukrainian-Russian actress.
Roger Wolff, 82, American baseball player.

24
Zbigniew Gołąb, 71, Polish-American linguist and slavist.
Hans Jakob, 85, German football player.
John L. May, 71, American Roman Catholic archbishop, brain cancer.
Walle Nauta, 77, Dutch-American neuroscientist.
Edith Porada, 81, Austrian-American art historian and archaeologist.
David van Vactor, 87, American composer of contemporary classical music.
Jiang Yizhen, 79, Chinese communist politician.

25
Rudi Feld, 97, German art director and set designer.
Angelines Fernández, 69, Spanish-Mexican actress and comedian, lung cancer.
Bernard Kangro, 83, Estonian writer and poet.
Max Petitpierre, 95, Swiss politician and jurist.
Jesus M. Vargas, 89, Filipino politician.

26
Whina Cooper, 98, New Zealand Māori leader.
Wadad Hamdi, 70, Egyptian actress, stabbed.
Owen McCann, 86, South African Catholic cardinal and journalist.
Margaret Millar, 79, American-Canadian writer.

27
Otto Bonsema, 84, Dutch football player and manager.
Frances Donaldson, Baroness Donaldson of Kingsbridge, 87, British writer and biographer.
Elisabeth Schmid, 81, German archaeologist and osteologist.
Lawrence Wetherby, 86, American politician.

28
Richard Brandram, 82, British Army officer.
Albert Goldman, 66, American academic and author.
Ștefan Gușă, 53, Romanian general, cancer.
Eugène Ionesco, 84, Romanian-French playwright.
Cyrus Longworth Lundell, 86, American botanist.
Ira Murchison, 61, American sprinter and Olympic champion, cancer.
Wendell Niles, 89, American radio and television announcer, cancer.

29
Paul Grimault, 89, French animator.
Lynda Hull, 39, American poet, car accident.
William Huston Natcher, 84, American politician.
Charles Oser, 92, American politician.
Bill Travers, 72, British actor, screenwriter, and animal rights activist.
Jiang Zehan, 91, Chinese mathematician.

30
Ina Hooft, 100, Dutch painter.
Leslie Howard Saunders, 94, Canadian politician and Mayor of Toronto.
William Arthur Ward, 72, American motivational writer.
Sid Weiss, 79, American jazz double-bassist.

31
Léon Degrelle, 87, Belgian politician and nazi collaborator, heart attack.
Henri Gouhier, 95, French philosopher and literary critic.
William Henry Hance, 42, American soldier and serial killer, execution by electrocution.
Medea Japaridze, 71, Soviet/Georgian actress.
Mohibullah "Mo" Khan, 56, Pakistani squash player.
José Escobar Saliente, 85, Spanish comic book writer and artist.

References 

1994-03
 03